The visa policy of Russia deals with the requirements which a foreign national wishing to enter the Russian Federation must meet to obtain a visa, which is a permit to travel to, enter, and remain in the country. Visa exemptions are based on bilateral or multilateral agreements. Russia has agreements with scores of countries whose citizens are either exempt from visas or can apply for a visa online (e-visa). Citizens of countries without such an agreement with Russia must obtain a visa in advance from a Russian diplomatic mission or visa centre.

Foreign citizens, while in the territory of Russia, must comply with the legislation of Russia, including requirements of customs, border and immigration regimes, rules of travel finance, registration, internal movement within the territory of Russia and extensions of stay. Nothing limits the right of competent authorities of Russia to deny entry or to shorten the period of stay in the territory of Russia for foreign citizens.

Travel restrictions due to the COVID-19 pandemic

Due to the COVID-19 pandemic, Russia has imposed the following temporary travel restrictions:

On 28 June 2021, Russia resumed flights with Belgium, Bulgaria, Jordan, Ireland, Italy, Cyprus, North Macedonia, USA, Turkey, Austria, Armenia, Greece, Qatar, Serbia, Finland, Croatia, and Switzerland.

On 27 January 2021, Russia resumed flights with Finland, Vietnam, India and Qatar.

From 15 August 2020, restrictions are lifted for citizens of Switzerland.

From 1 August 2020, restrictions on entry to Russia were lifted for citizens of Abkhazia, Tanzania, Turkey, and the United Kingdom. The issuance of entry visas and invitations has also been resumed.

The issuance of Russian electronic visas for the Far East District, Kaliningrad Oblast, and St Petersburg and Leningrad has been suspended since 18 March 2020 and has not been resumed yet.

For foreign citizens who are in Russia on the basis of a visa or visa-free regime, the duration of temporary stay is suspended From 15 March to 15 June 2020.

From 18 March until a special order of the government, all foreign citizens (except citizens of CIS member nations, Abkhazia, South Ossetia from 20 March 2020) are not allowed to enter the Russian Federation. This does not apply to some category of travels.

From 13 March 2020, temporarily suspended the entry of citizens of Italy travelling for educational, work, private, tourist and transit purposes

From 28 February 2020, temporarily suspended the entry of citizens of Iran travelling for educational, work, private, tourist and transit purposes.

From 20 February 2020, temporarily suspended the entry of  citizens of China, Hong Kong, Macao, travelling for work, private, educational and tourist purposes.

Border-crossing points 
Foreign citizens may enter into the territory of Russia through the border-crossing points open to international passenger traffic. As of 11 June 2020, Russia has 386 checkpoints across the state border of Russia.

Land border with Belarus 
Citizens of third countries are not allowed to cross the Belarus–Russia land border due to a lack of international border crossing points, because passports must be stamped.
Visitors are advised to enter mainland Russia via other countries such as  Terehova–Burachki and  Senkivka–Novye Yurkovichi.

Entry will be allowed through the road checkpoints on the border between Russia and Belarus in 2021:

Land border with Kazakhstan 
Residents of the border areas of Kazakhstan who visit the territory of the border areas of Russia up to three days can enter Russia through checkpoints, which are specially installed for residents of border areas.

Visa policy map

Ordinary passports
Travellers who are nationals of the following 63(+2) nations are not required to obtain a visa prior to visit Russia as long as the length of their trip is within the visa waiver limit listed below.

From 2014, citizens of these countries—except for citizens of Belarus and South Ossetia, who have the right to unlimited visa-free entry to Russia—must not stay longer than 90 days within any 180-day period. Resetting the allowed period by leaving and re-entering the country is no longer allowed. Overstaying up to 180 days is punishable by a three-year entry ban, 180–270 days by a five-year entry ban, and over 270 days by a ten-year entry ban.

ID – May enter with a national ID card.
ID(KZ) – May enter with a national ID card if arriving from Kazakhstan.
1 – 90 days within any 365-day period.
2 – 90 days within any one-year period.
3 – 60 days within any 180-day period.
4 – 90 days within any 180-day period.
5 – 30 days within any 60-day period.

Tour groups

Common visa
On 19 June 2020, Russia and Belarus have signed an agreement on mutual recognition of visas.

After ratification visa-free entry will be available for holders of a valid visa or residence permit of Belarus.

Visa-free visits for up to 72 hours for cruise ship and ferry passengers 
Since May 2009 international tourists entering by regular ferry via several ports have been able to stay in Russia visa-free for up to 72 hours, provided that they spend the night on-board or in accommodation specifically approved by the travel agency.

In addition tourists entering by tourist cruise ships can leave the ship visa-free on tours organized by any authorized local tour company, when entering Russia through the ports of Anadyr, Kaliningrad, Korsakov, Novorossiysk, Murmansk, Sevastopol, Sochi, Saint Petersburg (Big port Saint Petersburg and Passenger Port of St. Petersburg), Vladivostok, Vyborg, Zarubino.

Entry to the port of St. Petersburg by regular ferry can be done only from the ports of Tallinn (Estonia) or Helsinki (Finland). It is also possible to travel visa-free for 72 hours from the port of Stockholm with the stop in Helsinki.

Visa-free zones 
 — Group travel to central and southern Kuril Islands for pre-approved lists of the Foreign Ministry. Visits are carried out on the basis of identity cards and inserts.

Visa-free for citizens of Japan who visit the burial place of relatives located in the Kuril Islands and Sakhalin Island, by pre-authorized list in the regional Russian-Japanese consultations.

On September 5, 2022, Russia terminated the agreement with Japan on facilitated visits to the Kuriles by Japanese citizens – former residents of these islands.

 — Residents of Alaska who are members of the indigenous population do not require a visa to visit Chukotka Autonomous Okrug if they have relatives (blood relatives, members of the same tribe, native people who have similar language and cultural heritage) in Chukotka.
Individuals must be invited by a relative in Chukotka and must leave Chukotka within 90 days. Entry points are in Anadyr, Provideniya, Lavrentiya and Uelen. The agreement was signed between USSR and USA on 23 September 1989 but came into force on 17 July 2015 after ratification by the United States.

Local border traffic
 — 90 days for holders of border traffic permit

From 6 June 2013 residents of the border areas of Latvia who have a permit for local border traffic can visit the border areas of Russia without a visa.

From 16 December 2018 amendments to the current agreement entered into force. The procedure for obtaining a permit was simplified, total period of stay (within 180 days) was canceled, and the stamping of travel documents at the border crossing was canceled.

 — 15 days for holders of border traffic permit
From 29 May 2012 residents of the border areas of Norway who have a permit for local border traffic can visit the border areas of Russia without a visa.

From 4 March 2017 the Protocol on amendments to the current agreement entered into force – residents of area of Neiden received the right to receive a permit for local border traffic.

 — 30 days, for a maximum total stay of 90 days within a 180-day period for holders of border traffic permit
From 27 July 2012 residents of the border areas of Poland who have a permit for local border traffic can visit Kaliningrad Oblast without a visa.

The agreement has been suspended for an indefinite period by Poland from 4 July 2016.

Crew members 
Visa is not required for crew members of airlines, sea crew, river crew, rail crew that have a bilateral agreement with the Russian government exempting crew members from visa requirements.

Citizens of following countries may visit Russia without a visa if they are travelling as part of the airline crew:
Afghanistan,
Algeria,
Austria,
Belgium,
Bulgaria,
Canada,
China, 
Croatia,
Cyprus,
Czech Republic,
Denmark,
Egypt,
Ethiopia,
Finland,
France,
Germany,
Greece
Iceland,
India,
Iraq,
Italy,
Japan,
Jordan,
Latvia,
Lebanon,
Libya,
Lithuania,<ref name="auto11">From 1 Jan 2003 
Luxembourg,
Malta,
Netherlands,
North Korea,
North Macedonia,
Norway,
Oman,
Poland,
Portugal,
Qatar,
Romania,
Singapore,
Spain,
Sri Lanka,
Sweden,
Switzerland,
Turkmenistan,
United Arab Emirates,
United Kingdom,
Vietnam.

Agreement was signed with Italy and it yet to be ratified.

Russian Government has instructed the Foreign Ministry to sign an agreement with Georgia, and Tunisia.

Citizens of following countries may visit Russia without a visa if they are travelling as part of the sea crew: Bulgaria,
China,1 
Croatia,
Cyprus,
DR Congo,
Egypt,
France,
Iran,
Iraq,
Lithuania,1 
North Korea,
Poland,
Tunisia,
TurkeyTurkmenistan,1 
Vietnam.

1 – including riverboats crew

Citizens of following countries may visit Russia without a visa if they are travelling as part of the railway crew:
China, North Korea,
Turkmenistan.

Visa-free transit
Direct airside transit
Passengers travelling through international airports do not need a visa for a transit of less than 24 hours in most circumstances,

provided a confirmed onward ticket is held and the traveller remains in the international transit area (without clearing regular passport control).

A transit visa is needed when transiting Russia to/from Belarus

The following international Russian airports do not have international transit areas, meaning a transit visa is required to connect there:

Saimaa canal
In accordance with a treaty between Russia and Finland, though there are passport controls at borders, a visa is not required for just passing through the Russian part of the Saimaa canal without leaving the vessel.

Värska–Ulitina road
The road from Värska to Ulitina in Estonia, traditionally the only road to the Ulitina area, goes through Russian territory for one kilometre (0.6 mi) of its length, an area called Saatse Boot. This road has no border control, but there is no connection to any other road in Russia. It is not permitted to stop or walk along the road. This area is a part of Russia but is also a de facto part of the Schengen area.

Diplomatic and service category passports 
Under reciprocal agreements, holders of diplomatic or various categories of service passports (official, service, special, consular) issued by the following countries, territories and jurisdictions are allowed to enter and remain in Russia for up to 90 days (unless otherwise noted) without a visa:

D — diplomatic passports
S — service passports
O — official passports
Sp — special passports
C — consular passports

1 – unlimited
2 – 3 months
3 – 90 days within any 365-day period
4 – 90 days within any one-year period
5 – 90 days within any 180-day period
6 – 60 days
7 – 30 days
8 – 14 days
9 – only for employees of Zimbabwe official institutions in Russia

Currently, visa exemption for diplomatic passport holders from  European Union (Include Iceland, Liechtenstein, Norway, Switzerland) countries have been suspended.

Among nationals of countries whose citizens are normally visa-exempt, holders of diplomatic or service category passports of Israel require a visa.

APEC Business Travel Card

The APEC Business Travel Card (ABTC) is a travel document issued to business travellers who are citizens of APEC participating economies.

Valid for five years, the card eliminates the need for its holder to possess a visa when visiting other APEC participating economies.

From 1 June 2013,

 holders of passports issued by the following countries who possess an APEC Business Travel Card (ABTC) containing

the "RUS" code on the reverse that it is valid for travel to Russia can enter visa-free for business trips for up to 90 days within any 180-day period.

ABTCs are issued to nationals of:

Electronic visa (Suspended) 
From 8 August 2017, the Ministry of Foreign Affairs of Russia started to implement the eVisa Program.

Citizens of the 18 countries could apply eVisa to visit to regions in the Far Eastern Federal District.

From 1 July 2019, citizens of the 54 countries could apply for single-entry business, humanitarian and tourist visas to visit the Kaliningrad region.

From 8 June 2019, citizens of Taiwan were added to the list for Far East.

From 1 October 2019, electronic visas have become valid for Saint Petersburg and Leningrad Oblast.

On 24 January 2020, the new list for the Far Eastern e-visa was approved.

Thus, the list of countries has become uniform for all regions where an electronic visa is applied.

On 1 January 2021, unified electronic visas were introduced in Russia.

On 6 October 2020, in accordance with the Decree of the Government of the Russian Federation No. 2571/2020, the list of States was approved.

These are all the countries whose citizens were allowed to enter Russia with an electronic visa as part of the pilot project.

The e-visa is a single entry visa, which is valid for a period of 60 days from the date of issue, and which allows a period of stay in the Russian Federation of up to 16 days from the date of entry.

Foreign citizens have the right to freedom of movement within the entire territory of Russia.

The 16-day e-visas are issued for private or business visit, tourism, as well as for participating in scientific, cultural, socio-political, economic, sporting events.

The application can be submitted no earlier than 40 days and no later than 4 days before the expected date of entry.

Applications for a e-visa will be processed in no more than 4 calendar days from the date of submission of the application.

The consular fee is $40 (children under 6 years of age get a visa free of charge).

e-Visa allows arrival and departure only through the following border crossing points:

Airports (16)

Seaports (6)

Railways (2)
Grodekovo Station (Pogranichny) – China side: Suifenhe Station
Khasan Station – North Korea side: Tumangang Station

Roads (14)

Ivangorod – Estonia side: Narva
Kunichina Gora – Estonia side: Koidula
Shumilkino – Estonia side: Luhamaa

Vyartsilya – Finland side: Niirala

Burachki – Latvia side: Terehova
Ubylinka – Latvia side: Grebnova

Chernyshevskoye – Lithuania side: Kybartai
Morskoye – Lithuania side: Nida
Pogranichny – Lithuania side: Ramoniškių
Sovetsk – Lithuania side: Panemunė

Bagrationovsk – Poland side: Bezledy
Gusev – Poland side: Gołdap
Mamonovo I – Poland side: Gronowo
Mamonovo II – Poland side: Grzechotki

Mixed (1)
Blagoveshchensk – China side: Heihe (over Amur, during navigation – river crossing, during freezing – road crossing)

Pedestrians (1)
Ivangorod – Estonia side: Narva

Nationalities eligible for e-Visas are as follows:

Closed cities 
Several closed cities in Russia require special authorization.

Areas requiring special permits 
In accordance with the Government Decree of 1992, 19 areas of the Russian Federation are closed to foreigners without special permits. This restriction does not apply to Russian citizens.

A full list of such areas:
1. Part of Kamchatka Krai.
2. abolished
3. Part of Primorsky Krai.
4. Part of Krasnoyarsk Krai.
5. Part of Orenburg Oblast.
6. Part of Nizhny Novgorod Oblast.
7. Part of The Republic of Mordovia.
8. Parts of Murmansk Oblast and the Republic of Karelia. Transit to/from Norway is possible by main road.
9. Parts of Arkhangelsk Oblast (include South part of Novaya Zemlya island) and the Komi Republic.
10. Parts of Sverdlovsk Oblast.
11. Parts of Chelyabinsk Oblast.
12. In Leningrad Oblast – all Russian islands of Gulf of Finland, except Gogland, and  strip along south coast of the Gulf of Finland.
13. Parts of Moscow Oblast.
14. Part of Kaliningrad Oblast, approx. 15%.
15. Part of Volgograd Oblast.
16. Part of Astrakhan Oblast.
17. Chukotka Autonomous Okrug, all except Bilibino region.
18. Part of Yamalo-Nenets Autonomous Okrug.
19. The Republic of North Ossetia-Alania, 45% of territory. Transit to border with Georgia and to border with South Ossetia are possible along the main roads. Tsey Gorge is opened for foreigners from 2012.

Crimea 
As of 2014 the disputed territory of Crimea is under Russian control and Russia enforces its visa policy there. However, Ukraine requires that foreigners should comply with Ukrainian visa regime including obtaining a Ukrainian visa if one is necessary. Otherwise, Ukraine may impose sanctions for "support of the temporary occupation of the Ukrainian territory".

Future changes 
The Russian Government has instructed the Foreign Ministry to sign an agreement on visa waiver with the following countries:
 – 21 days for tourist groups from 3 to 50 persons
 – 90 days for diplomatic and service passports
 – 90 days within 180 day-period for diplomatic and service passports
 – 90 days within 180 day-period for diplomatic and service passports
 – 90 days within 180 day-period for diplomatic, service and special passports
 – 90 days within 180 day-period for all passports

Visa waiver agreements have already been signed with the following countries but are not yet ratified or applied:
 – 90 days for diplomatic and service passports
 – 30 days for all passports
 – 90 days within 180 day-period for diplomatic and service passports
 – 90 days within any 180-day period for diplomatic passports
 – 90 days within any 180-day period for all passports.

In addition, Russia is currently in talks with Gulf countries as well as other countries to establish visa waiver agreements.

Agreements 
The Russian Federation has visa waiver agreements with 143 jurisdictions. In the table, red indicates agreements signed but not ratified or temporarily not applied.

Russia has concluded agreements that facilitate procedures for issuing visas to both Russian citizens and citizens of the partner jurisdiction on a reciprocal basis. Such agreements are in force with the following countries or political associations:

Russia has agreements on cancellation of consular fees with the following countries: Algeria (1965), Angola (15 Apr 1985), Iran (15 Feb 1966), Japan (1 Apr 1965), Mauritania (1967), New Zealand (1 Apr 1962).

Agreements were denounced with Bangladesh, Cambodia, India, and Pakistan

Visa 

The Russian visa is a machine-readable document, which is placed in the holder's passport. All fields are indicated in both Russian and English, but are filled out only in Russian. The holder's name appears in both the Roman and Cyrillic alphabets.

The name that appears in the machine-readable zone at the bottom of the visa represents the holder's Cyrillic name mapped into the Roman alphabet. This allows Russian computer systems to read the Cyrillic name, despite the machine readers only being able to read Roman alphabet letters. As a result, the spelling of a name in the machine-readable zone does not necessarily reflect its spelling in the visa's name field. For example, the name "Christoph" would appear in the field as "Kpиcтoф/Christoph", but the MRZ would contain the name "Kristof".

Contrary to guidelines for machine-readable documents, the issuing country's ISO code (RUS) is not shown at positions 3–5 (i.e. V<RUS). Instead, the first line is formatted as: VSURNAME<<GIVEN<NAMES.

While not necessarily printed on the visa (depending on the embassy), a photo is required in the visa application. The visa application form may be filled online and submitted to the diplomatic mission.

Types of visa

Depending on the purpose of entry into the Russian Federation and the purposes of stay, visas are categorized as:
 Private
 Business
 Tourist
 Educational
 Working
 Humanitarian
 Entry (for receiving shelter or to obtain citizenship in Russia)

Diplomatic visa
A diplomatic visa shall be issued to a foreign citizen holding a diplomatic passport.
A diplomatic visa is issued:
to foreign heads of state, foreign heads of government, members of the foreign official delegations, family members of such persons traveling with them or accompanying them – for a period of up to one year.
to diplomatic agents of diplomatic missions and consular officials of consular establishments, the staff of representations of the international organizations in the Russian Federation which have the diplomatic status in the Russian Federation, to family members of specified persons for a period of up to one year.
to foreign diplomatic and consular couriers for the term of business trip.
to officials of the foreign states who have the official status in the Russian Federation have the right to a diplomatic visa and who come for a working visit to diplomatic missions or consular establishments of the foreign states in the Russian Federation or to the international organizations or their representations in the Russian Federation, for a period of up to one year.

Service visa
A service visa is issued to the foreign citizen having service (consular, official, special) passport.
A service visa is issued:
to members of foreign official delegations, family members of such persons traveling with them or accompanying them – for a period of up to one year.
to administrative and technical and service personnel of diplomatic missions, consular employees and service personnel of consular establishments of the foreign states in the Russian Federation, representations of the international organizations in the Russian Federation and to family members of such persons for a period of up to one year.
to military personnel of armed forces of the foreign states and family members of such persons for a period of up to one year. Extension of term of stay in the Russian Federation by issuance of the multiple entry visa for a period of validity of the foreign trade contract registered in accordance with the established procedure, but no more than for five years is allowed to the military personnel of armed forces of the foreign states driving to the Russian Federation for implementation of international treaties of the Russian Federation and (or) decisions of public authorities of the Russian Federation in the field of military and technical cooperation, and family members of such persons.
to foreign state officials who have the official status in the Russian Federation have the right to be issued a service visa and those who travel for a working visit to diplomatic missions or consular establishments of the foreign states in the Russian Federation or in the international organizations or their representations in the Russian Federation, for a period of up to one year.

Ordinary visa
Depending on the purpose of entry of the foreign citizen into the Russian Federation and the purpose of his stay in the Russian Federation ordinary visas are subdivided on private, business, tourist, educational, working, humanitarian and entry visas to the Russian Federation for temporary residence or citizenship ceremony:

An ordinary private visa is issued for a period of up to three months to foreign citizens traveling to Russia for a short visit on the basis of an invitation letter. Citizens from certain countries (based on the principle of reciprocity) can receive a visa for a period of up to one year.
An ordinary business visa is issued for a period of up to one year to foreign citizens traveling to Russia for a business trip.
An ordinary tourist visa is issued for a period of up to one month (or on the basis of the principle of reciprocity for a period of up to six months) to foreign citizens traveling to Russia as tourists, if holding an invitation letter by a Russian tour operator. Invitations can be issued by many hotels on request (sometimes for a fee) or through various online services associated with Russian tour operators.An ordinary tourist group visa is issued for a period of up to one month to foreign citizens traveling to Russia as a tourist in an organized tourist group (not less than five people), of holding a confirmation by an organization in the unified federal register of tour operators.
An ordinary student visa is issued for a period of up to one year to foreign citizens traveling to Russia for training in the educational institution.
An ordinary work visa is issued to foreign citizens visiting Russia for work purposes for a period of validity of the employment contract or civil contract for performance of work (rendering services), but no more than for one year.
An ordinary humanitarian visa is issued for a period of up to one year (or on the basis of the principle of reciprocity for a period of up to five years) to foreign citizens visiting Russia for a scientific, cultural, political or a sport visit, religious communication and contacts, pilgrimage, charity, delivery of humanitarian aid.
An ordinary entry visa to Russia for receiving a shelter is issued to foreign citizens for a period of up to three months if holding a decision of the federal executive authority authorized on implementation of functions on control and supervision in the sphere of migration on recognition of this foreign citizen as a refugee on the territory of Russia.
An ordinary entry visa to Russia to obtain citizenship of the Russian Federation is issued to foreign citizens for a period of up to one year if holding a decision on recognition of such foreign citizen as a native speaker of Russian.
An ordinary entry visa to Russia to obtain permission for temporary resident is issued to foreign citizens for a period of up to four months.

Transit visa
A Transit visa is issued for a period of up to ten days to the foreign citizen for transit through the territory of Russia.

Visa of temporary living person
A visa of temporarily living person is issued for four months to the foreign citizen to whom entry into Russia is allowed for temporary residence, within a quota of delivery of permissions to temporary residence.

Applying for visa

All types of Russian entry visas are received through Russian embassies and consulates. Provided all the documents are ready, the process usually takes no more than 3-10 workdays for Russian travel visa.

Russian Tourist Visa requirements:
Original passport
One photo (colour, passport size photo)
Tourist invitation
Russian Consulate Application Form

The Russian Consulate requires the visa application form to be printed on A4 paper with right and bottom margins of 5mm. A failure to meet these requirements invalidates the form.

Exit
Russia requires that an alien who needs a visa on entry be in possession of a valid visa upon exit. To satisfy this formal requirement, exit visas sometimes need to be issued. Russia requires an exit visa if a visitor stays well past the expiration date of their visa. They must then extend their visa or apply for an exit visa and are not allowed to leave the country until they show a valid visa or have a permissible excuse for overstaying their visa (e.g., a note from a doctor or a hospital explaining an illness, missed flight, lost or stolen visa). In some cases, the Ministry of Foreign Affairs can issue a Return-Home certificate that is valid for ten days from the embassy of the visitor's native country, thus eliminating the need for an exit visa.

A foreign citizen granted a temporary residence permit in Russia needs a temporary resident visa to take a trip abroad (valid for both exit and return). It is also colloquially called an exit visa.

Costs for visa
Almost all Russian embassies and consulates, require visa applications to be submitted to semi-private visa processing centers instead of directly to the consular section of the embassy. Costs differ.

Fingerprinting
From January 2015 visa applicants from the United Kingdom, Denmark, Myanmar and Namibia will be obliged to provide fingerprint scans. After a trial period it will be decided whether to expand this to other countries as well.

Russia plans to require, from 1 July 2019, fingerprinting and photographing of all foreign citizens entering the Russian Federation without a visa and staying for more than 30 days.

Statistics

Visitor statistics
According to the Border Service of the Federal Security Service and the Federal State Statistics Service, most visitors arriving to Russia were from the following countries of nationality:

Visa statistics
Most visas were issued in the following countries:

History

General Rules

The law "On the legal status of foreign citizens in the USSR" was used by the Russian Federation. Action extended from 1 January 1993. Chapter III of the law "entry into the USSR and exit from the USSR Foreign citizens" was replaced adopted the Federal Law No.114-FZ 1996 "On the Order of Exit from the Russian Federation". The law was repealed with the adoption of the Federal Law 115-FZ on 25 Jul 2002 On the Legal Status of Foreign Citizens in the Russian Federation. The laws establishes that as a general rule all foreign citizens and stateless persons need visas for entry and exit from the territory of Russia and the period of temporary stay (90 days within any 180 days). It also establishes a number of exceptions addressing certain groups of travelers. The basis of the legal status of foreign citizens and stateless persons are secured primarily by the Constitution of the Russian Federation 1993 – Art. 62 and Art. 63.

According to the Russian Constitution, international treaties of Russia override the domestic legislation. Russia has concluded a number of bilateral or multilateral treaties on visa abolishing or simplification and is seeking to negotiate new such treaties. The visa policy Russia applies the principle of reciprocity, the principle of specular.

Visa-free 72-hour transit
In September, 2013 the president of Russia has sent the bill of introduction of 72-hour visa-free transit to parliament. The list of the airports and the list of the states which citizens will be able to use visa-free transit in the tourist purposes, will be approved by the Government of the Russian Federation after ratification. In 2014 the parliament has suspended ratification of the bill for an indefinite term.

Crimea
In April 2014 Crimea's Tourism Minister proposed a visa-free regime for foreign tourists staying at Crimean resorts for up to 12 days and a 72-hour visa-free stay for cruise passengers. Visa-free access for Chinese citizens was proposed in June 2014. Visa-free entrance in cruise courts to Sevastopol began to be carried out from September 2015 Other of the proposals has been not realized.

International events
Art events
Participants and members of delegations coming to participate in the musical events are either provided with a simplified visa regime (e.g. Eurovision Song Contest 2009) or the right of visa-free entry (e.g. International Tchaikovsky Competition 2015).
Currently (September 2015) the law providing permanent visa abolition for participants and jury members of art competitions is being planned by the Government of Russia. The focus of this regulation will be on the International Tchaikovsky Competition.

Economic events
Participants of the 1st Eastern Economic Forum in Vladivostok did not require a visa. Entrance was allowed with passport and the accreditation certificate only.

Participants of East Economic Forum in Vladivostok can visit an event without visas from 8 to 15 September 2018.

Sporting events
Prior to the adoption of a special law, participants and members of delegations arriving to sporting events, could count on a visa-free entry or visa facilitation (determined by law for each event which has to pass ratification in parliament and to be signed by the president). For the 2008 Champions League Final held in Moscow, also spectators were given such visa-free entry. On 13 May 2013 the presidential decree on the abolition of visas for athletes, coaches, team leaders and members of foreign official delegations, as well as judges from the international sports competitions came into effect. It envisages entry on the basis of passport and accreditation certificate. The order of the President or the Government of Russia is sufficient for visa abolition or simplification of registration of visas. Visas were abolished for participants of the 2013 Summer Universiade, the 2014 ICF Canoe Sprint World Championships in Moscow, the 2014 World Judo Championships in Chelyabinsk and the 16th FINA World Championships in Kazan. Participants of the XVI World Aquatics Championships in the Masters category were exempted from visa fees.

The right to enter Russia without a visa was also given to visitors during the 2014 Winter Olympics and 2014 Winter Paralympics in Sochi if they were in a possession of tickets for the event. Players of 2016 IIHF World Championship were able to obtain visas on arrival, for the fans were simplified procedure for issuing visas.
2017 FIFA Confederations Cup holders of tickets for matches of the championship could enter Russia without a visa with personalized card of viewer (also known as the passport of a fan or fan-ID) and national passport from 7 June to 12 July 2017, if holding a laminated FIFA FAN ID card; from 14 June to 2 July 2017, if holding a printed FIFA FAN ID electronic format card. The foreign citizens could use their FAN IDs for multiple visa-free entry into and exit from the Russian Federation.

2018 FIFA World Cup holders of tickets for matches of the championship were able to enter Russia without a visa with personalized card of viewer (also known as the passport of a fan or fan-ID) and national passport from 4 June to 25 July 2018.
Foreigners participating in events and athletes included in the lists of FIFA, will have to obtain visas, but in a simplified manner. In particular, visas for this category of citizens will be issued within 3 working days from the date of filing and without consular fees. This procedure will be applied until 31 December 2018.
Foreigners involved in activities and not participating in sporting events, will travel to and from Russia by an ordinary multiple-entry work visas that will be issued for a period of 1 year. Foreigners, attracted by the FIFA, its subsidiaries and contractors, confederations, national football associations, the Russian football Union, organizing Committee "Russia-2018" will be entitled to work in Russia without obtaining a patent.

See also

Visa requirements for Russian citizens
List of diplomatic missions of Russia
Foreign relations of Russia
Visa history of Russia

Notes

References

External links

The conditions of entry of foreign citizens in the Russian Federation of diplomatic, service (official, special), regular passport. (in Russian) May 2017 
Electronic visa / Consular department of MFA of Russia
FAN ID
Federal Law No.114-FZ On the Legal Status of Foreign Citizens in the Russian Federation (in English) (without additions) 
Federal Law No.114-FZ On the Legal Status of Foreign Citizens in the Russian Federation (in Russian) (with additions) 
Timatic. Visa & Passport Information

Russia
Foreign relations of Russia